Doug Cushman (born May 4, 1953) is an artist who has worked as a cartoonist and a book illustrator. He is also the author of a series of children's books.

Personal information
Doug Cushman was born in Springfield, Ohio, and moved to Connecticut with his family when he was 13 years old. While in high school he created comic books lampooning his teachers, selling them to his classmates for a nickel a piece. Cushman has illustrated and written over 120 books for children over his career since 1978. In his free time, Cushman enjoys painting, playing guitar, and cooking along with traveling the world. He spends most of his time in Paris, France, Europe, and the US.

Awards and honors

Awards
He received the National Cartoonist Society Magazine and Book Illustration Award for 1996
He was nominated the National Cartoonist Society Magazine and Book Illustration Award in 2000.

Honors
Reuben Award for Book Illustration from the Nationalist Cartoonists Society
New York Times Children's Books Best Sellers
New York Public Library's Best 100 Books of 2000
2009 California Young Readers medal

See also

References

External links
 
NCS Awards
 

1953 births
Living people
American cartoonists
American children's book illustrators
American children's writers